Dávid Schram (born April 24, 1976) is Hungarian musician and record producer, best known internationally as the guitarist of the Hungarian rock band FreshFabrik and the producer of Sexepil's Your Scream Is Music, and Shell Beach's This Is Desolation.

Life and career
In 2002 Schram obtained a Bachelor of Arts degree in recording engineering from the SAE Institute, Sydney.

In an interview with Zsanett Steszkó, published on Dalszerző.hu on 27 July 2017, Schram said that every song is a small kid which should be taken care of. In the interview he also revealed why he left his home country, Hungary, for Canada.

FreshFabrik

In September 1996, Schram joined FreshFabrik as a guitarist. He recorded the album entitled Nerve with the band in 1997. Two years after his arrival he left the band in September 1998. Schram later became the record producer for the band recording several albums such as MORA.

Production career

From 2002 to 2008 Schram worked for Warner Bros. in Budapest as a sound engineer. Schram started his record producer career by recording, mixing and mastering Heaven Street Seven's Szállj Ki és Gyalogolj in 2004 in Budapest at the Aquarium studios.

In 2006 Schram mixed Kistehén Tánczenekar's Szerelmes Vagyok Minden Nőbe.

In 2011 Schram was chosen as the producer of Veronika Harcsa's Lámpafény.

In 2012 Schram produced Shell Beach's This Is Desolation.

In 2013 Schram produced two songs (Wake The Coma Girl and Lybria) for The Challenger in Pieces's Fill Up The Airwaves EP.

Schram produced Sexepil's Your Scream Is Music which was released on 17 November 2014.

Discography
FreshFabrik
Nerve (1997)

Production career

Production

2003: Yellojack – Quarantine
2003: Junkies – Hat 
2003: Superbutt – The Unbeatable Eleven 
2004: Heaven Street Seven – Szállj Ki és Gyalogolj
2004: Neotones – Mi vagyunk
2006: Heaven Street Seven – Tudom, hogy Szeretsz Titokban

2009: Future Millionaire – Alone
2012: Shell Beach – This Is Desolation
2013: The Challenger in Pieces – Fill Up The Airwaves
2013: Blahalouisiana – Tales of Blahalouisiana
2014: Sexepil - Your Scream Is Music

Recording

2004: Szakcsi Generation with DeJohnette & Patitucci – 8 Trios For 4 Pianists
2004: FreshFabrik – Dead Heart in Living Water
2009: Poniklo – Poniklo

2009: Takács Eszter – Ha egy nő szeret
2009: Dániel Szabó Trio Meets Chris Potter – Contribution

Mixing

2006: Szabolcs Oláh Quartet – Inner Spring
2007: Kistehén – Szerelmes vagyok minden nőbe
2007: Budapest Bár – Vol. 1
2008: Yava – Folkcore
2008: Kistehén – Ember a fán
2008: Anti Fitness Club – Miért hazudom? Single
2008: Zséda – Rouge
2009: Jamie Winchester – The Cracks are Showing
2009: Bin-Jip – Enter
2010: Kolorado Kid – Soundtrack
2010: Kistehén – Picsába az űrhajókkal
2010: Besh o droM – Kertünk alatt
2011: Balázs Havasi – Drum and Piano project
2011: FreshFabrik – MORA
2011: Zséda – Legyen úgy Single
2011: Veronika Harcsa – Lámpafény
2011: A Hópárduc Talpra Áll – Soundtrack
2011: Veca Janicsák – Szenvedély Single
2012: Konyha – Konyhanyelv
2012: The Hated Tomorrow – Szer2012: Kollaps – Body Horror EP2012: Zséda – Ötödik Érzék2012: Patent – Tökélets2012: Blahalouisiana – The Wanderer Single2013: Dawnstar – Saturnine Valentines2013: Elefánt – Vérkeringő2013: Bozan – With your Knowledge EP2013: Vad Fruttik – Darabok2014: Uzipov – Bazaltkockák2014: András Petruska – Metropolita2014: Dirty Flow Club – Dirty Flow Club2014: Hippikiller – Mixtape From The Stripped Room2014: Szeder – Hab a tetején2014: Csodagyerek – Minden ott van, ahol lennie kell EP2014: Kollár-Klemencz – Legesleges2014: Uzipov – Szőrén a borzot2014: Anton Vezuv - Into the Sea2014: Anna & The Barbies – Upcoming Album2014: Volkova Sisters – Upcoming Album2014: Crescendo – Upcoming EP2014: Bin-Jip – Upcoming Album''

See also
FreshFabrik
Notable Hungarian producers

References

External links
Dávid Schram at Discogs
 https://www.linkedin.com/in/david-schram-5a23a68/
 https://www.alchemyofaudio.com/

1976 births
Hungarian rock guitarists
Male guitarists
Living people
Musicians from Budapest
21st-century guitarists
Hungarian male musicians